Strategem was the fourth studio album by Colorado rock band Big Head Todd and the Monsters, released in 1994.  It was the band's second Giant Records release, following their platinum Sister Sweetly released the year before. While the album failed to match the sales and popularity of the band's previous effort, several individual tracks were positively received by reviewers, including "Kensington Line" and "Neckbreaker". Several verses on the album were inspired by Buddhist koans.

The band recorded the album in an empty theater in Boulder, Colorado and attempted to return to a more indie music sound in the wake of their more commercial-sounding effort in "Sister Sweetly".

"Strategem" was a deliberate misspelling by the band of "stratagem", used in the album title and also found in the song title "Strategem", and in the lyrics of that song: "Here I stand by lovely strategem."

Track listing 
All songs written by Todd Park Mohr

Personnel 
 Todd Park Mohr – vocals, guitar, piano
 Rob Squires – bass, background vocals
 Brian Nevin – drums, percussion, background vocals
 Nick Forster – steel guitar, slide guitar
 Al Laughlin – organ
 Hazel Miller – background vocals
 Big Head Todd and the Monsters – producers, engineers
 Andy Torri – producer, engineer
 Andy Wallace  – mixing
 Howie Weinberg – mastering
 Steve Sisco – mixing assistant
 Kevin Clock – "transfers"
 Mickey Houlihan – "sounds"
 Janet Levinson – design
 Stephen McNamara – digital editing
 Jeff Shuey – digital editing, "transfers"
 Simeon Soffer – photography

References 

1994 albums
Big Head Todd and the Monsters albums
Giant Records (Warner) albums
Buddhist music albums